Valluvangad or Velluvangad a village located in the Malappuram district, in the state of Kerala, India. It is situated in Pandikkad Panchayath.

Demographics
 India census, Valluvangad had a population of 17641 with 8554 males and 9087 females.

References

   Villages in Malappuram district
Manjeri